Terthreutis furcata is a moth of the family Tortricidae. It is found in Vietnam.

The wingspan is 18 mm for males and 24 mm for females. The ground colour of the forewings is white and somewhat glossy. The strigulation (fine streaking) is grey brown and grey. The hindwings are cream and brown in the anal half.

References

Moths described in 2008
Archipini
Moths of Asia
Taxa named by Józef Razowski